Tomás de Torquemada is the fictional main villain in the comic strip Nemesis the Warlock, published in the British comic anthology 2000 AD. He eventually appeared in 7 episodes of spin-off adventures of his own. He is named after and inspired by the real life Tomás de Torquemada.

Fictional character biography

Originally the leader of The Tube Police, a fascist police force and quasi-religious order in the far future, he became the dictator of the entire human race from its base on Termight (planet Earth). His Empire wages a speciesist war against all alien species, whom Torquemada regards as "impure."

Torquemada's goal is to keep the human race united by their fear and hatred of all aliens. He is described as being totally evil and having absolutely no redeeming features whatsoever. In fact, late in the series, it was revealed (through the actions of Thoth, son of Nemesis the Warlock) that his previous incarnations have included Colonel John M. Chivington, Witchfinder General Matthew Hopkins, Adolf Hitler and his namesake, the original Torquemada. (He is, however, also a dedicated family man – he is distressed when Nemesis kills his children while escaping the Terminators and loves his wife Candida to such an extent he consorts with aliens in an effort to prevent her from divorcing him.)

After an accident in a teleporter, Torquemada lost his physical body but continued to survive as a ghostly spirit. He then began possessing the bodies of volunteer Terminators to use for himself. The bodies would rot and die after a short time and have to be replaced. This eventually contributed to Candida's loss of sanity.

"Be pure! Be vigilant! Behave!"
Torquemada's catchphrase of "Be pure! Be vigilant! Behave!" is also the title of Pat Mills' memoirs, describing his experiences in the comic industry.

The Terminators

Torquemada is served by a fanatical army of soldiers called Terminators, who are constantly at war with all alien races in the galaxy.

Death of a Tyrant

Torquemada's evil reign ended when Candida mysteriously recovered from her madness. Upon hearing the news, he had his then current wife, Sister Sturn murdered and made preparations for his second marriage to Candida. The wedding ceremony ended disastrously when his foe Nemesis appeared with Candida willingly fleeing from the temple with him.

Humiliated on live TV, his evil regime quickly crumbled but he still had one last trick. Stealing Nemesis' Blitzspear, he fled to the Hypogeum to activate a "Generation Bomb" (which would destroy all alien DNA on Earth). Before he could even activate it, Nemesis managed to contaminate him with alien DNA with his claws before using his remaining powers to make sure Torquemada would perish with him. When the bomb exploded, both Nemesis, his Blitzspear and Torquemada were merged and fell into the timestream for all eternity.

Family

Torquemada's family members who have been depicted include:
 Murcalla de Torquemada (mother, alive)
 Nostradamus de Torquemada (brother, alive but insane)
He became insane when he was ambushed by the Monads and Torquemada abandoned him to his fate instead of helping him. Torquemada had him committed to a lunatic asylum, and pretended Nostradamus was his senile grandfather.
 Candida de Torquemada (wife – annulled, second marriage interrupted, alive)
 Barbarossa de Torquemada (son, dead)
 Pandora de Torquemada (daughter, dead)
 Sister Sturn (wife, dead)
 Atilla de Torquemada (son by Sister Sturn, alive)

Publication

Nemesis the Warlock (by Pat Mills):
List of Nemesis stories

As well as appearing in Nemesis the Warlock he has appeared in his own eponymous series:

Torquemada (by Pat Mills):
 "The Garden of Alien Delights" (with Bryan Talbot, in Dice Man No. 3, 1986)
 "Torquemada the God" (with Kevin O'Neill, in 2000 AD #520–524, 1987)
 "Torquemada's Second Honeymoon" (with Kevin O'Neill, in 2000 AD Annual 1988, 1987)

Awards

1984 – won Eagle Award for Best Character
1985 – won Eagle Award for Favourite Villain (British Section)
1986 – won Eagle Award for Favourite Villain (British Section)
1987 – won Eagle Award for Favourite Villain (British Section)

See also 

 The Redeemer, another Pat Mills creation who (in the Warhammer 40,000 universe) purges mutants and deviants.

References

External links 
 2000 AD profile
 The Temple Of Terminus – a Torquemada mini-site

Comics by Pat Mills
Fictional dictators
Fictional mass murderers
2000 AD comic strips
2000 AD characters